Hora, also known as horo and oro, is a type of circle dance originating in Jewish communities and the Balkans but also found in other countries.

Etymology
The original meaning of the Greek word  may have been "circle".

Also, the words hora and oro are found in many Slavic languages and have the meaning of "round (dance)"; the verb oriti means "to speak, sound, sing" and previously meant "to celebrate".

The Greek  is cognate with Pontic Greek , and has also given rise to the names of Bulgarian , Macedonian , Romanian ,  /  in Serbo-Croatian, the Turkish form  and in Hebrew . The  dance of Georgia also might be connected to the Horon dance in the neighbouring Turkish regions, as it rose out of the Adjara region, where Kartvelian Laz people co-existed for centuries with Greek Pontians.

Variants

Romania and Moldova 
 

Horă (plural: hore) is a traditional Romanian and  where the dancers hold each other's hands and the circle spins, usually counterclockwise, as each participant follows a sequence of three steps forward and one step back. The dance is usually accompanied by musical instruments such as the cymbalom, accordion, violin, viola, double bass, saxophone, trumpet or the pan pipes.

The hora is popular during wedding celebrations and festivals, and is an essential part of the social entertainment in rural areas. One of the most famous hore is the "Hora Unirii" ("Hora of the Union"), which became a Romanian patriotic song as a result of being the hymn when Wallachia and Moldavia united to form the Principality of Romania in 1859. During the 2006/2007 New Year's Eve celebration, when Romania and Bulgaria joined the European Union, people were dancing Hora Bucuriei ("Hora of Joy") over the boulevards of Bucharest as a tribute to the EU anthem, Ode to Joy. Some of the biggest hora circles can be found on early 20th century movies filmed by the Manaki brothers in Pindus, Greece, and performed by local Aromanians.

Horo in Bulgaria 

The traditional Bulgarian dance horo comes in many shapes. It is not necessary to be in a circle; a curving line of people is also acceptable. The steps used in a horo dance are extremely diverse. The horo may vary between three and seven or eight steps forward and one to five or six steps back, depending on the specific type.

Bulgarians believe that each village has their own type of horo. They differ by the rhythm of the music and the steps taken. There are no two horo dances with similar steps. There are probably over one hundred types of horo dances in the Bulgarian folklore.

In the past, the horo dance had a social role in Bulgarian society. It was mainly for fun, as a contest of skills, or for show, leading to the development of the variety of horo dances. There are hora for people with little skill that can be learned in five to ten minutes, but there are also very sophisticated dances that cannot be learned unless one is fluent in many of the simpler dances.

Oro in North Macedonia 

North Macedonia uses the Cyrillic spelling of oro. The origins of Macedonian oro vary from its use in socializing and celebrating, to historical dancing before going into battle. Teshkoto, translated "The difficult one", is one of those, danced by men only, the music of which reflects the sorrow and mood of war. The oro is danced in a circle, with men and women holding one another by hand. They are used to celebrating occasions such as weddings, christenings, name-days, national and religious holidays, graduations, birthdays.

Romani horo 
The horo is also popular among the Romani people of Southeastern Europe, and the dancing is practically the same as that of the neighboring ethnicities. Romani Horos, and Romani music in general, are very much appreciated among non-Romani people in the Balkans, as they also have a reputation as the skillful performers of other folk music there.

Jewish horah

Klezmer horah 
In klezmer music, the horah refers to a circle dance. The horah has a slow, limping gait in triple meter, often three/eight time, and generally leads into a faster and more upbeat duple meter, usually a  freylekh or a bulgar. Among Yiddish-speaking Jews, the triple-meter hora has also been called zhok or krumer tants (meaning "crooked dance").

Israeli horah 
The horah (הורה), which differs somewhat from that of some of the Eastern European countries, is widespread in the Jewish diaspora and played a foundational role in modern Israeli folk dancing. It became the symbol of the reconstruction of the country by the socialistic-agricultural Zionist movement. Although considered traditional, some claim it rose to popularity due to Hora Agadati, named after dancer and choreographer Baruch Agadati and performed for the first time in 1924. According to Gurit Kadman, the original melody was a Moldavian folk tune, which in mid-1940s was recognized by composer Uriya Boskovitz as an anti-Semitic one, and Gurit asked Boskovitz to write a new one. About the same time Ze’ev Havatselet wrote a lyrics to the tune (found, e.g., in the Library of Congress). Now the dance is usually performed to Israeli folk songs, and sometimes to Jewish songs, often to the music of "Hava Nagila".

To start the dance, everybody forms a circle, holding hands or interlocking arms behind their backs or on their shoulders, and steps forward toward the left with the right foot, then follows with the left foot. The right foot is then brought back, followed by the left foot. This is done while holding hands and circling together in a fast and cheerful motion to the left. Large groups allow for the creation of several concentric circles, or a large spiral formation.

In the early days, horah was popular mainly in kibbutzim and small communities, often continuing for hours.

The horah became popular in group dances throughout Israel, and at weddings and other celebrations by Jews in Israel, the United States, United Kingdom, and Canada. The dance appeared in North America in the early 20th century, well before modern Israeli independence, brought directly from Eastern Europe by Jewish immigrants.

At Jewish weddings during the horah it is customary to raise the bride and groom, each on their own chair and holding a handkerchief between them, following Jewish tradition. This is also done at b'nai mitzvah, where the honoree and sometimes his, her or their family members are also raised on a chair, copying the wedding tradition.

The song "Hora", sung by Avi Toledano, who represented Israel in the Eurovision Song Contest 1982, is based on this dance.

Other variants

Horon in Turkey 
Horon in several variants is danced in Black Sea Region / Pontos of modern-day Turkey.

Oro in Montenegro 
The oro circle dance should not be confused with the Montenegrin Oro dance of Montenegro and Herzegovina, which is a paired courtship dance. Its name comes from the Serbian оrао, meaning "eagle".

Perinița

Perinița is a traditional Romanian wedding folk dance. The dance is typical in the Muntenia region.

See also 
 Adana (dance), a Macedonian oro
 An Dro, a Breton circle dance
 Attan, a dance performed by Pashtun people in Afghanistan and Pakistan
 Circle dance
 Dabke
 Faroese dance
 Horae
 Khigga, an Assyrian circle dance
 Khorovod, an Eastern European circle dance
 Kochari
 Kolo (dance), Serbian, Croatian and Bosnian circle dance
 , Belarusian circle dance
 Syrtos
 Tamzara
 Tresenica, a Macedonian oro performed by women
 Yalli

References

Circle dances
European folk dances
Romanian folk dances
Moldovan folk dances
Turkish dances
Greek dances
Macedonian dances
Klezmer
Dance in Israel
Slavic carnival
Bulgarian dances